Ronald Rhoads (born September 7, 1933) is an American cyclist. He competed in the individual and team road race events at the 1952 Summer Olympics.

References

External links
 

1933 births
Living people
American male cyclists
Olympic cyclists of the United States
Cyclists at the 1952 Summer Olympics
Sportspeople from Long Beach, California